Tong-Kwang Light House Presbyterian Church is the first Christian Church for Homosexuals in Chinese society. It is located in Taipei, Taiwan, and does not believe homosexuality to be a sin. It was established on 5 May 1996.

Although the church has a system of Presbyterianism, it is independent from the Presbyterian Church in Taiwan.

The church also works with Taiwan Tongzhi Hotline Association, and attends Taiwan Pride.

History
Founded in 1996, the Tong-Kwang Light House is the first LGBTQ-affirming church in Taiwan.

See also

 Christianity and homosexuality
 LGBT-welcoming church programs

References

External links
 Tong-Kwang Light House Presbyterian Church 

1996 establishments in Taiwan
LGBT churches in Taiwan
20th-century Presbyterian churches
Christian organizations established in 1996